Robert T. Beers (born October 14, 1959) is an American accountant (CPA) and member of the Republican Party who was a 2018 candidate for Nevada Treasurer. He was previously an elected member of the Las Vegas City Council from 2012 to 2017, Nevada Assembly from 1998 to 2004 and the Nevada Senate from 2005 to 2008. He ran unsuccessfully for the Republican nomination for Governor of Nevada in 2006 and in January 2014, he announced that he would run against Democratic Senator Harry Reid in the 2016 U.S. Senate election, but he withdrew from the race in June 2015. In 2018, he was defeated for State Treasurer by Zach Conine.

Early and personal life
Beers moved to Las Vegas at age 11, graduating from Ed W. Clark High School with high honors in 1977 and from the University of Nevada, Las Vegas with distinction with a Bachelor of Science in Business Administration degree in 1987.

His community activities include: current volunteer treasurer for the Old Spanish Trail Association, with past treasurer service to Southern Nevada Clean Communities, the Tonopah Historic Mining Park Foundation, and the Nevada Republican Party; president of the Las Vegas Chamber of Commerce Business Expo; and President-elect for the Las Vegas Chamber of Commerce Business Council. As a volunteer, he has created or maintained websites for over a dozen community organizations.

Professional career
A Certified Public Accountant (CPA) since 1989, Beers founded Las Vegas computer accounting consultants Wilson, Beers & Alu in 1989, and sold it to a large local CPA firm in 2002. This company specialized in PC-based networks with multi-user accounting software. From 2004-2007, he was the marketing director for an outsourcer of HR. In 2009, he started Seale and Beers, CPAs, an auditor of small public companies, which he managed until 2012. He currently consults business owners on their treasuries.

Before becoming a Certified Public Accountant, Beers worked for radio broadcasting companies in Reno, Nevada and Las Vegas as News Director. At KMJJ in 1982, he won "Best Miniseries" and "Best Newscast" awards from the Associated Press in the AP's Medium Market California-Nevada-Hawaii division.

Political career
In 1998, Beers was elected to the Nevada Assembly, the lower house of Nevada's Legislature. As Assemblyman representing District 4, Beers served in three regular and three special sessions. He was assigned to the Ways & Means, Commerce & Labor, and Elections, Procedures & Ethics committees of the Assembly.

In 2003, Beers led a group of legislators in opposition to Governor Kenny Guinn's tax increases, citing concerns that they might damage Nevada's economy. After several special sessions, Beers' voting bloc failed and the tax increases were passed. The following year, Beers was elected to the Nevada Senate, defeating 20-year incumbent Republican Ray Rawson who had supported the increases.

Beers served in the Nevada Senate for the 2005 and 2007 Legislative sessions. He was appointed Vice-Chairman of the Senate Finance Committee, where he worked on the complex state budget. He also served as a member of the Committees on Natural Resources and Legislative Operations.

In 2006, Beers and his supporters gathered over 150,000 signatures to put a Taxpayer Bill of Rights amendment (called TASC for Tax And Spend Control) on the November 2006 general election ballot, which proposed that increases in spending greater than the sum of inflation and population growth require an affirmative vote of citizens.

He ran for Governor of Nevada in the 2006 election, but finished second in the Republican primary, behind U.S. Representative Jim Gibbons, who would go on to win the general election.

In 2008, Beers was defeated for re-election by Democrat Allison Copening. Beers sued for defamation, and the Nevada Democratic Party settled out-of-court in 2010. He held no further public office until 2012, when Beers was elected to the non-partisan Las Vegas City Council in a nine-way special election to fill the vacant seat of Councilman Steve Wolfson, who had been appointed Clark County District Attorney. He was elected to a full four-year term the next year.

Beers declared in January 2014 that he was running for the Republican nomination to challenge Senator Harry Reid in the 2016 election but he withdrew in June 2015.

Beers lost reelection to the Las Vegas City Council in 2017, finishing first in the May 1 primary contest but losing the June 27 runoff to Steve Seroka, with Seroka winning 3,979 to Beers' 3,387 votes.

Beers ran for Nevada State Treasurer in the 2018 elections, but lost to Democrat Zach Conine.

References

External links
Nevada State Legislature - Senator Bob Beers official government website
Project Vote Smart - Senator Bob Beers (NV) profile
Beers for Nevada official campaign website

1959 births
American accountants
Candidates in the 2018 United States elections
Las Vegas City Council members
Living people
Republican Party members of the Nevada Assembly
Republican Party Nevada state senators
People from Livermore, California
University of Nevada, Las Vegas alumni